Dubá is a town in Česká Lípa District in the Liberec Region of the Czech Republic. It has about 1,700 inhabitants. The town centre is well preserved and is protected by law as an urban monument zone.

Administrative parts
Villages and hamlets of Bukovec, Deštná, Dražejov, Dřevčice, Heřmánky, Horky, Horní Dubová Hora, Kluk, Korce, Křenov, Lhota, Nedamov, Nedvězí, Nový Berštejn, Panská Ves, Plešivec, Sušice, Zakšín and Zátyní are administrative parts of Dubá.

Geography
It lies in the Ralsko Uplands. There are two ponds in the municipal territory, Černý and Rozprechtický. Černý is used for recreational purposes, Rozprechtický is used for fish farming. Most of the territory lies in the Kokořínsko – Máchův kraj Protected Landscape Area.

History

According to archaeological finds, there was an old Slavic settlement, existing from the first half of the 11th century. The first written mention of Dubá and Lords of Dubá is from 1253. The Berka of Dubá family owned the town until 1622. After the Battle of White Mountain, their properties were confiscated and Dubá was acquired by Albrecht von Wallenstein. After that, the owners of Dubé often changed.

Because of large fires in 1692, 1711 and 1845, Dubá never became a big town.

Until 1918, the town was part of the Austrian monarchy (Austria side after the compromise of 1867), head of the Dauba district, one of the 94 Bezirkshauptmannschaften in Bohemia. From 1938 to 1945, it was annexed by Nazi Germany and administered as a part of the Regierungsbezirk Aussig of Reichsgau Sudetenland. After the World War II, the German population was expelled.

Demographics

Sights

The landmark of the Dubá is the Church of the Finding the Holy Cross. It was built in the late Baroque style in 1744–1760. The interior is equipped with rococo furniture.

Nový Berštejn Castle was built in 1553–1567. In 1945, it was confiscated by the state and adapted to a special boarding school. After falling into disrepair, it was to be demolished, but it was bought by a private owner in 1991 and repaired. Since 1997, the castle has been used as a hotel with a sports complex.

Notable people
Gerold Tietz (1941–2009), German writer

Twin towns – sister cities

Dubá is twinned with:
 Mirsk, Poland

References

External links

Cities and towns in the Czech Republic
Populated places in Česká Lípa District